Vasilios Rentzas (born 16 April 1992) is a Greek professional footballer who plays as a right back for Super League 2 club Kallithea.

Career
Born in Melivoia, Rentzas played as an amateur at the local team Filoktitis, until he signed a 5-year professional contract with AEL, on 15 June 2010. He made his professional club debut on 26 October 2010 playing against Ethnikos Piraeus during the 4th round of the Greek Football Cup.

In August 2011, Rentzas was released from his contract with AEL after the club was relegated at the end of the 2010–11 season, and went on to sign a 5-year contract with Superleague Cretan side Ergotelis on August 30, 2011. His contract was renewed for another year on 1 September 2015. After the team withdrew from professional competitions in January 2016, due to major financial problems, Rentzas, who was one of the team's veterans with 61 appearances and 1 goal over the course of 4,5 years and part of only 17 players who had stayed with the club until the very end, was released from his professional contract. Consequently, on 30 January 2016 he returned to AEL once more signing a 2,5-year contract. On July 11, 2018, his move to Panionios got announced.

Career statistics

Club

References

External links
Profile at Onsports.gr
 http://www.ael1964.gr/inside.asp?lang=el&pid=3&sel=0&ch=592
 http://www.imscouting.com/players/vasilios-rentzas/

1992 births
Living people
Greek footballers
Greece youth international footballers
Athlitiki Enosi Larissa F.C. players
Ergotelis F.C. players
Panionios F.C. players
Super League Greece players
Association football midfielders
People from Larissa (regional unit)
Footballers from Thessaly